Quiet Zone may refer to:

 Radio quiet zone, an area where radio transmissions are restricted in order to protect a radio telescope or a communications station from radio frequency interference
 The United States National Radio Quiet Zone in West Virginia, Virginia and Maryland
 Quiet Zone (film), 2015 experimental documentary short film about people living in this zone
 The area before and after a barcode which is kept clear so that the barcode scanner can identify where the code starts and ends
 Railroad crossing quiet zone; in North America, a section of railroad track where trains are not required to sound their horns when approaching a grade (or level) crossing
 The Quiet Zone/The Pleasure Dome, album by British progressive rock band Van der Graaf Generator